Tom Harris was a football manager who was Secretary/Manager of Notts County between 1893 and 1913. He was the manager when Notts won the FA Cup in 1894 beating Bolton Wanderers 4-1 at Goodison Park.

References

English football managers
Notts County F.C. managers
Year of birth missing
Year of death missing
Date of birth missing
Date of death missing